The Keuffel and Esser Manufacturing Complex is located in Hoboken, Hudson County, New Jersey, United States. The western concrete building with the four-sided clock tower was built in 1906 and opened in 1907, after the previous building was destroyed by a fire in 1905. Keuffel and Esser  manufactured instruments for the architectural, engineering and drafting professions at the complex from 1907 to 1968.

In 1975 the building was converted to housing. The western half of the complex became known as Clock Towers, while the eastern half of the complex (which was built in 1887) was converted into residential apartments in 1984 and became what is now called the Grand Adams Apartments. The complex was added to the National Register of Historic Places on September 12, 1985.

See also
National Register of Historic Places listings in Hudson County, New Jersey

References

Buildings and structures in Hoboken, New Jersey
Commercial buildings on the National Register of Historic Places in New Jersey
Industrial buildings completed in 1906
National Register of Historic Places in Hudson County, New Jersey
Apartment buildings in New Jersey
New Jersey Register of Historic Places
Clock towers in New Jersey
1906 establishments in New Jersey